CSKA (Cyrillic: ЦСКА) is an abbreviation for "Central Sports Club of the Army" in several Slavic languages, and refers to military sports teams in may stand for:

Bulgaria
 Football clubs
 PFC CSKA - Sofia, a professional association football club
 USC CSKA Sofia 
 HC CSKA Sofia, a professional ice hockey club
 BC CSKA Sofia, a professional basketball club
 VC CSKA Sofia, a professional volleyball team

Kyrgyzstan
 Shoro-SKA Bishkek, now FC Alga Bishkek, a Kyrgyz professional association football club

Moldova
 CSCA-Rapid Chişinău

Poland
 Legia Warsaw, also known as CWKS Legia Warszaw

Romania
 CSA Steaua București, a major multi-sports club based in Bucharest, known as CSCA from 5 June 1948 to March 1950

Russia
 CSKA Moscow
 CSKA Moscow (bandy club)
 HC CSKA Moscow, a professional ice hockey club
 PBC CSKA Moscow, a professional basketball club
 PFC CSKA Moscow, a professional association football club
 VC CSKA Moscow, a professional volleyball club
 CSKA (Moscow Metro), a metro station that serves the facilities of CSKA Moscow
 CSKA Samara, a Russian women's basketball team from Samara, Russia
 FC SKA Rostov-on-Don, a professional association football club
 SKA Saint Petersburg, a professional ice hockey club
 Amur Khabarovsk, a professional ice hockey club founded as SKA Khabarovsk
 FC SKA-Khabarovsk, a professional association football club

Tajikistan
 CSKA Dushanbe
 CSKA Pamir Dushanbe
 SKA-Khatlon Farkhor

Ukraine
 CSKA Kyiv (handball), a team handball club from Kyiv, Ukraine
 CSK ZSU Stadium, in Kyiv
 FC CSKA Kyiv

See also 
 Armeesportvereinigung Vorwärts, the East German equivalent sports club
 SKA (disambiguation)